15 of the Best is a compilation album by Canadian Country singer Anne Murray. It was released by Liberty Records in the spring of 1992. The album peaked at number 62 on the Billboard Top Country Albums chart.

Track listing

Chart performance

References

1992 compilation albums
Anne Murray compilation albums
Liberty Records compilation albums